James Hook,   (16 June 1771 – 5 February 1828) was an English Anglican priest. He was Dean of Worcester from 1825 until his death.

Early life and education
The son of the composer James Hook, he was born 16 June 1771. He was educated at Westminster School and St Mary Hall, Oxford.

Ordained ministry
He was ordained in 1796. He married the daughter of the prominent Scottish physician Walter Farquhar. After having held several livings  in 1814  he became Archdeacon of Huntingdon; and in 1817 Rector of Whippingham.

An amateur mountaineer, novelist and composer, he died  on 5 February 1828. His brother  and son also achieved eminence in their respective fields.

References

External links

1771 births
1828 deaths
People educated at Westminster School, London
Alumni of St Mary Hall, Oxford
Fellows of the Royal Society
Fellows of the Society of Antiquaries of London
Deans of Worcester